Deriana or Daryanah is a town in the Benghazi District, of the Cyrenaica region in northeastern Libya. It is located 32 km (20 mi) east of Benghazi.

The town's name probably came from the ancient Roman city Hadrianopolis, also known as Hadriane, which was located near present-day Deriana.

Because of a lack of archaeological evidence at Deriana, Gareth Angelbeck, a South African archaeologist, suggests that Hadrian's city was located at the more archaeologically promising Wadi Jawbiyah site, a few kilometers inland from Deriana.

References

Populated places in Benghazi District
Archaeological sites in Libya
Cyrenaica